Highway 319 (AR 319, Ark. 319, and Hwy. 319) is a designation for two state highways in central Arkansas. The main segment runs  from AR 38 in Ward to AR 107 south of Vilonia. A short segment runs  from Cadron Settlement Park to US 64 in Conway.

Route description

Ward to Vilonia
The route begins at its southern terminus, Highway 38 in the unincorporated community of Old Austin. Highway 319 runs north through Ward, briefly concurring with Highway 367 before turning west and crossing US 67/US 167 (Future I-57) at an interchange. The route continues west across Highway 5 to terminate at Highway 107 south of Vilonia.

Cadron Settlement Park to Conway
Highway 319 begins outside Conway at Cadron Settlement Park. The route runs northeast to US 64, where it terminates.

Major intersections

See also

References

External links

319
Transportation in Faulkner County, Arkansas
Transportation in Lonoke County, Arkansas
Conway, Arkansas